A Four-in-hand is any vehicle drawn by four horses driven by one person. 
Driving large heavy carriages and private coaches drawn by four horses was a popular sporting activity of the rich after the middle of the 19th century.

England's Four-in-Hand Driving Club was formed in 1856. Membership was limited to thirty and they all drove private coaches known as park drags made on the pattern of the old Post Office mail coaches but luxuriously finished and outfitted. A new group called the Coaching Club was formed in 1870 for those unable to join the club of 30. Other enthusiasts revived old coaching routes and took paying passengers.

T. Bigelow Lawrence of Boston owned America's first locally built park drag in 1860. Leonard Jerome took to driving coaches with six and eight horse teams to go to watch horse races. New York's Coaching Club was formed in 1875.

Today Four-in-hand driving is the top discipline of combined driving in equestrian sports. One of its major events is the FEI World Cup Driving series. 

The four-in-hand knot used to tie neckwear may have developed from a knot used in the rigging of the lines.

Four-in-Hand in Art

References

Carriages
Animal-powered vehicles